Guǎngzhōu or Guǎng Prefecture was a zhou (prefecture) in imperial China in the Pearl River Delta. Its administrative area contained parts of modern Guangdong, as well as both modern Hong Kong and Macau. Between 601 and 607 it was known as Pan Prefecture, between 742 and 758 as Nanhai Commandery, and in the 10th century (before 971) as Xingwang Prefecture (as the capital of Southern Han).

The modern sub-provincial city Guangzhou, established in 1918, retains its name.

Counties
Nanhai
Panyu
Zengcheng
Qingyuan
Huaiji
Dongguan
Xinhui
Yining or Xin'an
Sihui
Xiangshan
Huameng
Jianshui
Chengyang
Hankuang

References

 
 
 

Prefectures of the Sui dynasty
Prefectures of the Tang dynasty
Prefectures of Southern Han
Guangnan East Circuit
Former prefectures in Guangdong